Lim Yong-kyu was the defending champion, but lost to Greg Jones in the 2nd round.
Dudi Sela defeated Tatsuma Ito 6–2, 6–7(5), 6–3 in the final match.

Seeds

Draw

Finals

Top half

Bottom half

References
Main Draw
Qualifying Singles

Busan Open Challenger Tennis - Singles
2011 Singles